Harry J. Sonneborn (June 12, 1916 – September 21, 1992) was an American businessman, best known for being the first president and chief executive of McDonald's Corporation.

Life and career
Sonneborn was born in Evansville, Indiana, the son of Minnie (Greenbaum) and Mark Harry Joseph. He was adopted and raised by his paternal aunt, Jeanette (Joseph), and her husband, Louis Sonneborn, in New York City. His family was Jewish.

Work with McDonald's
A former vice president of finances at Tastee-Freez, Sonneborn approached Ray Kroc with the concept of Kroc owning the land that McDonald outlets were to be built on and then leasing that land to the franchisee. This business model led to the explosive growth of McDonald's; the real estate deals were handled through a specially formed corporation named McDonald's Franchise Realty Corp. The "Sonneborn model" persists to this day within the corporation, and might have been the most important financial decision in the company's history. McDonald's present-day real estate holdings represent $37.7Bn on its balance sheet, about 99% of the company's assets and about 35% of its global revenue.

Kroc appointed Sonneborn as McDonald's first president and chief executive officer in 1959, which he held until he resigned in 1967, due to falling out with Kroc. Kroc had insisted on continuing expansion whereas Sonneborn was conservative with the view that the country was heading into a recession and put a stop on constructing new stores. Kroc took his title afterwards.

Other business interests
After leaving McDonald's, Sonneborn continued to be involved in the business world through the stock market, capital investments, and banking. He and his wife Aloyis founded several philanthropic foundations.

In popular culture
In the 2016 film The Founder,  Sonneborn was portrayed by actor B. J. Novak, who spoke the famous line "You're not in the burger business; you're in the real estate business."

Further reading

References

External links

1916 births
1992 deaths
Businesspeople from New York City
20th-century American Jews
American business executives
McDonald's people
Deaths from diabetes
20th-century American businesspeople
American adoptees